Adrian John Nichol (born December 1963) is a retired Royal Air Force navigator who was shot down and captured during the Gulf War.

Early life
Adrian John Nichol was born in North Shields, and attended the St Cuthbert's Grammar School on Gretna Road in Newcastle upon Tyne. He joined the Royal Air Force (RAF) in February 1981 as an electronics technician; having signed up in 1980 and needing sufficient O levels. In the intervening period between school and the RAF, he worked in a large DIY store, although his employers were not aware of his military plans until they sought to promote him to management and he decided to tell them.

RAF career
Nichol was commissioned as a navigator in December 1986. He served with XV Squadron based at RAF Laarbruch, Germany. During Operation Granby in the Gulf War, the squadron was deployed to Muharraq Airfield in Bahrain. Nichol's first mission, on 17 January 1991, entailed flying as number two to Squadron Leader Paul "Pablo" Mason on an ultra-low-level sortie against Ar Ruma airfield. During the flight, his Panavia Tornado GR1 ZD791 was critically damaged by a shoulder-launched SA-14 surface-to-air missile, and Nichol and his pilot, John Peters, were captured by Iraqi forces. After capture Nichol was shown, bruised, on Iraqi television. He was tortured in the Abu Ghraib prison. Nichol was released by the Iraqis at the end of the Gulf War.

Nichol remained in the RAF until March 1996. After repatriation by the Red Cross, Nichol co-authored a book, Tornado Down, with John Peters, about this experience.

Author and broadcaster
Since 'Tornado Down', Nichol has written over ten books including five novels: Point of Impact, Vanishing Point, Exclusion Zone, Stinger and Decisive Measures. His latest books provide extensive eyewitness accounts of Second World War history and include The Last Escape, which tells the harrowing story of Allied prisoners of war in the closing stages of the war; Tail-End Charlies, which gives an insight into the final battles of the Allied bomber campaign in the Second World War; and Home Run which recounts the experiences of escaped Allied prisoners of war evading capture in Europe behind enemy lines. Medic: Saving Lives – from Dunkirk to Afghanistan (2009) was short-listed for the 2010 Wellcome Trust Book Prize.

Nichol now makes occasional appearances on British television as a presenter and sometimes works in radio as a stand-in presenter on talkSport. He also works as a motivational speaker.

Personal life
Nichol lives in Hertfordshire. His daughter was born in 2005. His parents live in North Shields.

References

External links
 John Nichol's Web Site
 Penguin biography
 
 Tornado ejections
 Interview with Historvius.com

1963 births
Living people
British navigators
British prisoners of war
English writers
Flight navigators
Gulf War prisoners of war
People from North Shields
Royal Air Force officers
Royal Air Force personnel of the Gulf War
Shot-down aviators
Prisoners of war held by Iraq
20th-century English male writers